State Route 259 (SR 259) is a short state highway in the U.S. state of California that serves as a freeway connector between I-215 and SR 210 in San Bernardino. It has one complete exit (Highland Avenue) and one partial exit (E Street, northbound only).

Route description
SR 259 splits off from I-215 as a full freeway and continues north, interchanging with Highland Avenue. SR 259 then turns east and has a partial interchange with E Street before merging with SR 210. SR 259 thus provides a route for traffic to move between I-215 northbound and SR 210 eastbound as well as from SR 210 westbound to I-215 southbound; the interchange between SR 210 and I-215 does not provide these movements.

Almost all signage along the route either mention "To I-215 south" or "To SR 210 east" instead of SR 259, including the exits from SR 210 and I-215, respectively, the freeway entrances from Highland Avenue, and an overhead guide sign along northbound SR 259. Since 2022, Caltrans had erected SR 259 reassurance markers just beyond the start of the entrance ramps from SR 210 and I-215.

SR 259 is part of the California Freeway and Expressway System, and is a freeway for its entire length, and is part of the National Highway System, a network of highways that are considered essential to the country's economy, defense, and mobility by the Federal Highway Administration.

History

The portion of SR 30 between I-215 and SR 259 did not exist in the 1960s-1970s, and traffic used SR 259, which was then designated as SR 30. Prior to its role as a state highway, the route followed by SR 259 formed a portion of the  Santa Fe "Kite-Shaped Track" which looped throughout Southern California, including through communities of the eastern San Bernardino Valley.

Exit list

See also

References

External links

California @ AARoads.com - State Route 259
Caltrans: Route 259 highway conditions
California Highways: SR 259

259
259
State Route 259
Transportation in San Bernardino, California